Muhammad Arif Chaudhry (born 1 January 1959) is a Pakistani politician who had been a member of the National Assembly of Pakistan from June 2013 to 2015.

Early life
He was born on 1 January 1959 in Arain family.

Political career
He was elected to the National Assembly of Pakistan as a candidate of Pakistan Muslim League (N) (PML-N) from Constituency NA-144 (Okara-II) in 2013 Pakistani general election. He received 105,162 votes and defeated Shafeeqa Baghum Rao Sikindar Iqbal, a candidate of Pakistan Peoples Party (PPP).

In 2015, he was denotified as member of the National Assembly after he was disqualified to continue in office because of fake degree case.

References

Living people
Pakistan Muslim League (N) politicians
Punjabi people
Pakistani MNAs 2013–2018
People from Okara, Pakistan
1959 births